The 2013 US Open was a tennis tournament played on outdoor hard courts. It was the 133rd edition of the US Open, the fourth and final Grand Slam event of the year. It took place at the USTA Billie Jean King National Tennis Center, and ran from August 26 to September 9.

Andy Murray and Serena Williams were the defending champions in the singles events. Williams successfully defended her title, but Murray was defeated in the quarterfinals by Stanislas Wawrinka. Rafael Nadal won the men's singles.

Tournament

The 2013 US Open was the 133rd edition of the tournament and was held at USTA Billie Jean King National Tennis Center in New York City, United States.

The tournament was an event run by the International Tennis Federation (ITF) and was part of the 2013 ATP World Tour and the 2013 WTA Tour calendars under the Grand Slam category. The tournament consisted of both men's and women's singles and doubles draws as well as a mixed doubles event. There were singles and doubles events for both boys and girls (players under 18), which was part of the Grade A category of tournaments, and after one-year break due to Paralympic Games in London singles, doubles and quad events for men's and women's wheelchair tennis players as part of the NEC tour under the Grand Slam category.

The tournament was played on hard courts and took place over a series of 17 courts, including the three main showcourts, Arthur Ashe Stadium, Louis Armstrong Stadium and Grandstand.

Notable events
 In 2008–2012, due to inclement weather conditions, the tournament lasted 15 instead of the scheduled 14 days, ending on the third Monday. In 2013, the schedule was extended to 15 days, potentially giving the players one more day to prepare for the final match. 
 Maria Sharapova, 2006 champion, ranked third in the world (formerly first), withdrew from the tournament due to a shoulder injury.
 In a second round match which pitted the 2001 and 2009 men's champions against each other, Lleyton Hewitt defeated Juan Martín del Potro in five grueling sets lasting over four hours; this marked the first time since he won the title in 2001 that Hewitt had defeated a top ten opponent at the US Open.
 By winning the first set in her fourth round loss to Victoria Azarenka, Ana Ivanovic won her first set against a top ten opponent at a Grand Slam since she won the 2008 French Open, ending a streak of 15 consecutive sets lost against a top ten seed.
 Serena Williams won 24 consecutive games from 1–1 in the second set against Sloane Stephens in the fourth round through to 1–0 in the second set against Li Na in the semi-finals, breaking her own record of 23 games at last year's US Open.
 For the second consecutive year, Serena Williams and Victoria Azarenka contested the women's final, marking the first time since 2001–2 in which two consecutive US Open finals were contested between the same two players.
 With Novak Djokovic and Rafael Nadal contesting the men's final, this marked the first time since the 2000 Australian Open in which both the men's and women's finals were contested between the top two.
 By winning the tournament, both Rafael Nadal and Serena Williams collected the biggest payday in tennis history of $3.6M ($2.6M for the championship and an added $1M bonus for winning the 2013 US Open Series). Also, with the win, Williams and Nadal have now won each Grand Slam together – the Australian Open (2009), the French Open (2013), Wimbledon (2010) and the US Open (2013). They are the first male-female pair in the entire history of tennis, not just in the Open Era, to win all four Grand Slams together.
 By winning the US Open, Rafael Nadal became the first player since Andy Roddick in 2003 to capture the 3 major consecutive US hardcourt season titles, namely the Roger's Cup, Cincinnati Masters and US Open.
Note:

Ana Ivanovic retired in the second set of her fourth round match against Venus Williams at Wimbledon in 2009; thus, the losing streak of sets is 15.

Point and prize money distribution

Point distribution
Below is a series of tables for each of the competitions showing the ranking points on offer for each event.

Seniors points

Wheelchair points

Junior points

Prize money
The US Open total prize money for 2013 was increased by almost nine million dollars to tournament record $34,300,000.

In the 2013 season, the US Open prize money was the highest out of four grand slam tournaments, compared to $30m at the Australian Open, $29m at the French Open, and $34m at the Wimbledon Championships.

* per team

Bonus prize money
Top three players in the 2013 US Open Series received bonus prize money, depending on where they finish in the 2013 US Open, according to money schedule below.

Singles players
2013 US Open – Men's singles

2013 US Open – Women's singles

Day-by-day summaries

Events

Seniors

Men's singles

  Rafael Nadal defeated  Novak Djokovic, 6–2, 3–6, 6–4, 6–1
• This was Nadal's 13th career Grand Slam singles title and his 2nd at the US Open

Women's singles

  Serena Williams defeated  Victoria Azarenka, 7–5, 6–7(6–8), 6–1
• This was Williams' 17th career Grand Slam singles title and her 5th at the US Open

Men's doubles

  Leander Paes /  Radek Štěpánek defeated  Alexander Peya /  Bruno Soares, 6–1, 6–3
• This was Paes' 8th career Grand Slam doubles title and his 3rd at the US Open
• This was Štěpánek's 2nd career Grand Slam doubles title and his 1st at the US Open

Women's doubles

  Andrea Hlaváčková /  Lucie Hradecká   defeated  Ashleigh Barty /  Casey Dellacqua, 6–7(4–7), 6–1, 6–4
• This was Hlaváčková's 2nd career Grand Slam doubles title and her 1st at the US Open
• This was Hradecká's 2nd career Grand Slam doubles title and her 1st at the US Open

Mixed doubles

  Andrea Hlaváčková /  Max Mirnyi defeated  Abigail Spears /  Santiago González, 7–6(7–5), 6–3
• This was Hlaváčková's 1st career Grand Slam mixed doubles title
• This was Mirnyi's 4th career Grand Slam mixed doubles title and his 3rd at the US Open

Juniors

Boys' singles

  Borna Ćorić defeated  Thanasi Kokkinakis, 3–6, 6–3, 6–1

Girls' singles

  Ana Konjuh defeated  Tornado Alicia Black, 3–6, 6–4, 7–6(8–6)

Boys' doubles

  Kamil Majchrzak /  Martin Redlicki defeated  Quentin Halys /  Frederico Ferreira Silva, 6–3, 6–4

Girls' doubles

  Barbora Krejčíková /  Kateřina Siniaková defeated  Belinda Bencic /  Sara Sorribes Tormo, 6–3, 6–4

Wheelchair events

Wheelchair men's singles

  Stéphane Houdet defeated  Shingo Kunieda, 6–2, 6–4

Wheelchair women's singles

   Aniek van Koot defeated  Sabine Ellerbrock 3–6, 6–2, 7–6(7–3)

Wheelchair quad singles

  Lucas Sithole defeated  David Wagner, 3–6, 6–4, 6–4

Wheelchair men's doubles

  Michaël Jérémiasz /  Maikel Scheffers defeated  Gustavo Fernández /  Joachim Gérard, 6–0, 4–6, 6–3

Wheelchair women's doubles

  Jiske Griffioen /  Aniek van Koot defeated  Sabine Ellerbrock /  Yui Kamiji, 6–3, 6–4

Wheelchair quad doubles

  David Wagner /  Nick Taylor defeated  Andrew Lapthorne /  Lucas Sithole, 6–0, 2–6, 6–3

Singles seeds
The following are the seeded players. Ranking and seeding are according to ATP and WTA rankings on August 19, 2013.

Men's singles

Withdrawn players

Women's singles

Withdrawn players

Wild card entries
Below are the lists of the wild card awardees entering in the main draws.

Men's singles wild card entries
  Collin Altamirano
  Brian Baker
  James Duckworth
  Ryan Harrison
  Bradley Klahn
  Tim Smyczek
  Guillaume Rufin
  Rhyne Williams

Women's singles wild card entries
  Ashleigh Barty
  Nicole Gibbs
  Vania King
  Virginie Razzano
  Alison Riske
  Shelby Rogers
  Maria Sanchez
  Sachia Vickery

Men's doubles wild card entries
  James Blake /  Jack Sock
  Jarmere Jenkins /  Mac Styslinger
  Steve Johnson /  Michael Russell
  Bradley Klahn /  Sam Querrey
  Austin Krajicek /  Denis Kudla
  Alex Kuznetsov /  Bobby Reynolds
  Paul Oosterbaan /  Ronnie Schneider

Women's doubles wild card entries
  Mallory Burdette /  Taylor Townsend
  Jill Craybas /  CoCo Vandeweghe
  Lauren Davis /  Grace Min
  Daniela Hantuchová /  Martina Hingis
  Allie Kiick /  Sachia Vickery
  Melanie Oudin /  Alison Riske
  Shelby Rogers /  Maria Sanchez

Mixed doubles wild card entries
  Kaitlyn Christian /  Dennis Novikov
  Victoria Duval /  Donald Young
  Martina Hingis /  Mahesh Bhupathi 
  Megan Moulton-Levy /  Eric Butorac 
  Melanie Oudin /  Austin Krajicek
  Sabrina Santamaria /  Jarmere Jenkins
  Yasmin Schnack /  Eric Roberson
  Sloane Stephens /  Jack Sock

Qualifiers entries

Men's singles qualifiers entries

  Mikhail Kukushkin
  Ivo Karlović
  Florent Serra
  Philipp Petzschner
  Rogério Dutra da Silva
  Somdev Devvarman
  Thomas Fabbiano
  Donald Young
  Nick Kyrgios
  Frank Dancevic
  Peter Gojowczyk
  Go Soeda
  Dan Evans
  Máximo González
  Stéphane Robert
  Albano Olivetti

The following player received entry as a lucky loser:
  Andrej Martin

Women's singles qualifiers entries

  Casey Dellacqua
  Sharon Fichman
  Grace Min
  Victoria Duval
  CoCo Vandeweghe
  Duan Yingying
  Kurumi Nara
  Maria João Koehler
  Vera Dushevina
  Mirjana Lučić-Baroni
  Chanel Simmonds
  Michelle Larcher de Brito
  Julia Glushko
  Ajla Tomljanović
  Alexandra Krunić
  Camila Giorgi

The following players received entry as lucky losers:
  Patricia Mayr-Achleitner 
  Olivia Rogowska

Protected ranking
The following players were accepted directly into the main draw using a protected ranking:

 Men's Singles
  Pablo Cuevas (PR 54)
  Jürgen Zopp (PR 88)

 Women's Singles
  Petra Cetkovská (PR 55)
  Alexandra Dulgheru (PR 58)
  Alisa Kleybanova (PR 24)
  Aleksandra Wozniak (PR 41)

Withdrawals
The following players were accepted directly into the main tournament, but withdrew with injuries, suspensions or personal reasons.

Men's Singles
 Marin Čilić → replaced by  Jan-Lennard Struff
 Mardy Fish → replaced by  Andrej Martin
 Gilles Simon → replaced by  Andreas Haider-Maurer
 Viktor Troicki → replaced by  Rajeev Ram
 Jo-Wilfried Tsonga → replaced by  David Goffin

Women's Singles
 Marion Bartoli → replaced by  Anna Tatishvili
 Ayumi Morita → replaced by  Olivia Rogowska
 Garbiñe Muguruza → replaced by  Tímea Babos
 Romina Oprandi → replaced by  Dinah Pfizenmaier
 Yulia Putintseva → replaced by  Flavia Pennetta
 Maria Sharapova → replaced by  Patricia Mayr-Achleitner

Retirements
Men's Singles
 Pablo Cuevas
 Juan Mónaco
 Philipp Petzschner
 Guillaume Rufin
 Dmitry Tursunov

Media coverage

References

External links

 Official site of 2013 US Open

 
 

 
US Open
2013 in American tennis
US Open
US Open
2013
US Open
US Open
US Open